Michael Allen Davis (born January 14, 1972) is a former American football defensive back who played for the Houston Oilers and the Cleveland Browns of the National Football League (NFL). He played college football at University of Cincinnati.

References 

Living people
American football defensive backs
Cincinnati Bearcats football players
1972 births
Players of American football from Ohio
Houston Oilers players
Cleveland Browns players